Rhodes is a locational surname, with other spellings Rhoades, Rhoads, Roads, Roades, and Rodes, deriving from the Old English rod, meaning "a clearing in the woods", or from one of a number of locations from this word. Topographical features provided obvious and convenient means of identification in the small communities of the Middle Ages, giving rise to various surnames. Locational surnames arose when former inhabitants of a place moved to another town or area and were identified by the name of their birthplace.

Notable people with this surname include:

Rhodes A–D
Alan Rhodes (disambiguation), several people, including:
Alan Rhodes (rugby league), English rugby league footballer who played in the 1960s, 1970s and 1980s, and coached in the 1980s
Alan Rhodes (rugby league, born in Bradford), English rugby league footballer who played in the 1960s and 1970s, and coached in the 1980s
Albert Rhodes (diplomat) (1840–1904), American diplomat and author
Alex Rhodes (cyclist) (born 1984), female Australian racing cyclist
Alex Rhodes (footballer), English footballer
Alexandre de Rhodes, French Jesuit missionary
Alexis Rhodes, fictional character in Yu-Gi-Oh! GX
Amelia Atwater-Rhodes, American author
Andy Rhodes, retired English football goalkeeper
Anthony Rhodes, journalist and author of The Vatican in the Age of the Dictators
April Rhodes, fictional character in Glee
Arthur Rhodes (born 1969), Major League Baseball relief pitcher
Arthur Rhodes (1859–1922), New Zealand Member of Parliament and Mayor of Christchurch
Atticus Rhodes, fictional character in Yu-Gi-Oh! GX
Augustus Rhodes, former Chief Justice of the Supreme Court of California
Austin Rhodes, English rugby league footballer who played in the 1950s, 1960s and 1970s and coached in the 1970s
Ben Rhodes (footballer)
Ben Rhodes (racing driver) (born 1997), American NASCAR driver
Bernard Rhodes, former manager of The Clash
Billy Rhodes (English rugby league), English rugby league footballer who played in the 1910s and 1920s, and coached in the 1920s through to the 1950s
Carol Rhodes (1959–2018) Scottish painter
CeCe Rhodes, fictional character in Gossip Girl
Cecil Rhodes (1853–1902), British businessman after whom Rhodesia was named, theorist of imperialism, creator of the Rhodes Scholarship
Christopher Rhodes, former British film and television actor
Cody Rhodes (born 1985; birth name Cody Runnels), American professional wrestler and son of wrestler Dusty Rhodes
Cynthia Rhodes, American actress, singer and dancer
Damian Rhodes, retired NHL goaltender
Dan Rhodes, English writer
David Rhodes (disambiguation), several people, including:
Dave Rhodes, purported author of the electronic chain letter "Make.Money.Fast"
David Rhodes (author), American novelist
David Rhodes (cricketer), English-born New Zealand cricketer
David Rhodes (footballer), former Australian rules footballer
David Rhodes (kayaker), Australian sprint canoeist
Dominic Rhodes, running back in the National Football League
Donnelly Rhodes, Canadian television actor
Doralee Rhodes, fictional character in Nine to Five
Doris Rhodes (1898–1982), British bridge player
Doris Lindsey Holland Rhodes (1909–1997), American politician
Doug Rhodes, multi-instrumentalist
Dustin Rhodes (born 1969; real name Dustin Runnels), American professional wrestler also known as Goldust; son of wrestler Dusty Rhodes
Dusty Rhodes (baseball coach) (born 1946), American college baseball coach
Dusty Rhodes (cricketer) (1916–1983), English cricket player and umpire
Dusty Rhodes (footballer) (1882–1960), English footballer and manager
Dusty Rhodes (outfielder) (1927–2009), American baseball player
Dusty Rhodes (wrestler) (1945–2015; real name Virgil Runnels, Jr.), American professional wrestler and father of Cody and Dustin Rhodes

Rhodes E–J
E. C. Rhodes, statistician and economist who worked with Arthur Bowley and Karl Pearson
Edgar Nelson Rhodes, Canadian parliamentarian and premier of Nova Scotia
Elisha Hunt Rhodes, Brigadier General in the Union Army
Emitt Rhodes (1950–2020), American singer/songwriter
Erik Rhodes (actor, born 1906), American actor
Erik Rhodes (pornographic actor), American pornographic actor
Ernie Rhodes, English footballer
Esther Biddle Rhoads (1896–1979), American educator, relief worker
Frank Rhodes (British Army officer) (1851–1905), brother of Cecil, 19th century British Army Colonel in Africa
Frank H. T. Rhodes, president of Cornell University
Gary Rhodes (1960–2019), English celebrity chef and restaurateur
George Rhodes (farmer) (1816–1864), New Zealand pastoralist
George Rhodes (musician), American arranger, conductor, pianist, and music director
Happy Rhodes, American singer, songwriter, instrumentalist and electronic musician
Hari Rhodes, American actor
Harold Rhodes (disambiguation), several people
Heaton Rhodes (1861–1956), New Zealand politician and lawyer
 Captain Henry Rhodes, fictional character in Day of the Dead.
Hervey Rhodes, Baron Rhodes (1895–1987), British Labour Party politician
Ida Rhodes, mathematician
Izora Rhodes, Izora Armstead; one half of the pop group the Weather Girls
James Rhodes (disambiguation), several people
James Rhodes (cricketer), English cricketer
James Rhodes (pianist) (born 1975), English pianist
James Ford Rhodes, American industrialist and historian
Jane Rhodes (1929–2011), French opera singer
Jay B. Rhodes, American inventor
Jean Rhodes, American academic psychologist and author
Jennifer Rhodes, American actress
Jewell Parker Rhodes, American novelist
Jim Rhodes, four-term governor of Ohio
John Harold Rhodes, English recipient of the Victoria Cross
John Jacob Rhodes III, former Republican representative
John Jacob Rhodes, American politician and lawyer
John Rhodes (racing driver), British former racing driver
John W. Rhodes, former Republican member of the North Carolina General Assembly
Jonty Rhodes, former South African cricketer
Jordan Rhodes, Scottish footballer

Rhodes K–Z
Kay Rhodes, American bridge player
Kerry Rhodes, American football safety
Kim Rhode, American double trap and skeet shooter
Kim Rhodes, American actress
Kristin Rhodes, Professional Strongwoman, Worlds Strongest Woman
Lana Rhoades, former American Adult Film Star
Lancelot Barrie Rhodes, (1934-2021) New Zealand musician 
Leah Rhodes, former American costume designer
Lou Rhodes, English singer and songwriter
Lucinda Rhodes-Flaherty, British television and film actress
Luke Rhodes (born 1992), American football player
The Honourable Margaret Rhodes, first cousin and close friend of Queen Elizabeth II
Marjorie Rhodes (1897–1979), British actress of motion pictures and television
Mark Rhodes, British pop singer and television presenter
Mel Rhodes, creativity researcher and originator of the 4 P of creativity
Michael Rhodes (disambiguation), several people
Mike Rhodes (American football), American football player
Nick Rhodes, the English keyboardist for Duran Duran
P. J. Rhodes (1940–2021), British academic and ancient historian
Pam Rhodes, British television presenter
Paul Rhodes, Canadian political strategist
Pauline Rhodes (born 1937), New Zealand artist
Peter Rhodes, former American journalist
Peyton Nelle Rhodes, 15th president and namesake of Rhodes College in Memphis, Tennessee
Philip Rhodes, prolific boat designer who designed the 1962 America's Cup winner, Weatherly
Phillip Rhodes (drummer), drummer for the Gin Blossoms
Randi Rhodes, talk radio host
Ray Rhodes, former American football head coach
Richard Rhodes (born 1937), American author, notably of Deadly Feasts about prion diseases, and of The Making of the Atomic Bomb
Robert Heaton Rhodes (1815–1884), New Zealand politician
Rufus N. Rhodes, founder of the Birmingham News, and vice-president of the Associated Press
Rufus R. Rhodes, Chief Clerk of the Confederate Patent Office, 1861–1865
Sarah Rhodes (1787–1862), illustrator
Stephen Rhodes (radio presenter), former weekday daytime presenter on BBC Three Counties Radio
Steve Rhodes, former English cricketer
Teddy Tahu Rhodes (born 1966), New Zealand bass-baritone
Thomas L. Rhodes (1939–2018), American political editor and president of National Review magazine
Trevante Rhodes (born 1990), American sportsman in track and fields and film and television actor 
Trevor Rhodes (disambiguation), several people
Tuffy Rhodes (born 1968), American professional baseball player
Walter Rhodes (musician), American blues musician
Wilfred Rhodes, former English cricketer
William Rhodes (disambiguation), several people
Xavier Rhodes, American Football Cornerback for the Indianapolis Colts
Zandra Rhodes, English fashion designer

Rhoades
Barbara Rhoades (born 1946), American actress
Elijah Rhoades (1791–1858), New York politician
Katharine Nash Rhoades, (1885–1964), American painter
Kevin C. Rhoades, American Catholic bishop
Kitty Rhoades (1951–2016), American politician
Marcus Morton Rhoades (1903–1991), American cytogeneticist
Paul Ezra Rhoades (1957–2011), American spree killer executed in Idaho
Robert Ben Rhoades (born 1945), American serial killer also known as "The Truck Stop Killer"
Sarah Rhoades from America's Next Top Model, Cycle 5

Rhoads
Daniel Rhoads (1821–1895), American pioneer and rancher
David Rhoads (born 1931), American Olympic cyclist
George Rhoads (1926–2021), American artist, designer of Rolling ball sculptures
Ronald Rhoads (born 1933), American Olympic cyclist
Randy Rhoads (1956–1982), American rock guitarist
Samuel Rhoads (1711–1784), architect, Mayor of Philadelphia

Roads
Curtis Roads
Elizabeth Roads

Rodes
Robert E. Rodes, Confederate general in the American Civil War

Rodeš
Istok Rodeš, Croatian alpine ski racer

See also
Justice Rhodes (disambiguation)
Rhodes (disambiguation)
Rhode (disambiguation)
Rohde

References

English-language surnames